Yusefabad-e Pain (also Romanized as Yūsefābād-e Pā’īn; also known as Yoosef Abad, Yūsefābād, Yūsefābād-e Zīrafzār, and Yūsofābād) is a village in Borj-e Akram Rural District, in the Central District of Fahraj County, Kerman Province, Iran. At the 2006 census, its population was 599, in 138 families.

References 

Populated places in Fahraj County